Love in the Night (French: Vivre la nuit, Italian: La ragazza della notte) is a 1968 French-Italian drama film directed by Marcel Camus and starring Jacques Perrin, Catherine Jourdan and Georges Géret.

Cast
 Jacques Perrin as	Philippe
 Catherine Jourdan as Nora
 Georges Géret as Bourgoin
 Estella Blain as 	Nicole
 Serge Gainsbourg as 	Mathieu
 Venantino Venantini as 	Bollert
 Michel Creton as 	Jacky, le loubard
 Marcel Gassouk as Le chauffeur de Bourgoin
 Albert Minski as Minski
 François Patrice as François Patrice

References

Bibliography 
 Rège, Philippe. Encyclopedia of French Film Directors, Volume 1. Scarecrow Press, 2009.

External links 
 

1968 films
French drama films
Italian drama films
1968 drama films
1960s French-language films
Films directed by Marcel Camus
1960s French films
1960s Italian films